Douglas Robinson may refer to:

 Douglas Robinson Sr. (1824–1893), Scottish-American banker
 Douglas Robinson Jr. (1855–1918), American broker
 Douglas Robinson (English cricketer) (1884–1963), English cricketer
 Douglas Robinson (French cricketer) (1864–1937), French cricketer
 Douglas Robinson, expert on the Hindenburg disaster 
 Doug Robinson (ice hockey) (born 1940), NHL hockey player
 Douglas Robinson (academic) (born 1954), American translation scholar and translator
 Doug Robinson (producer), American media executive and producer